The 58th Utah State Legislature was elected Tuesday, November 5, 2008 and convened on Monday, January 26, 2009.

Dates of sessions 

 2009 General Session: January 26, 2009 - March 12, 2009

Leadership

Senate 

 President of the Senate: Michael G. Waddoups (R-6)

Majority (Republican) Leadership

 Majority Leader: Sheldon Killpack (R-21)
 Majority Whip: Scott K. Jenkins (R-20)
 Assistant Majority Whip: Greg Bell (R-22)
 Senate Rules Committee Chair: Margaret Dayton (R-15)

Minority (Democratic) Leadership

 Minority Leader: Patricia W. Jones (D-4)
 Minority Whip: Ross I. Romero (D-7)
 Assistant Minority Whip: Karen Mayne (D-5)
 Minority Caucus Manager: Luz Robles (D-1)

House of Representatives 

 Speaker of the House: David Clark (R-74)

Majority (Republican) Leadership

 Majority Leader: Kevin Garn (R-16)
 Majority Whip: Brad Dee (R-11)
 Majority Assistant Whip: Rebecca Lockhart (R-64)
 House Rules Committee Chair: Ben Ferry (R-2)

Minority (Democratic) Leadership

 Minority Leader: David Litvack (D-26)
 Minority Whip: James Gowans (D-21)
 Minority Assistant Whip: Carol Spackman Moss (D-37)
 Minority Caucus Manager: Jennifer Seelig (D-23)

Composure

Senate Makeup

Members

House of Representatives Makeup

Members

Employees/Staff 
 Legislative Research Library and Information Center
 Office of Legislative Printing
 Office of the Legislative Auditor General
 Office of the Legislative Fiscal Analyst
 Office of Legislative Research and General Counsel

See also 

 Government of Utah
 List of Utah State Legislatures

External links 
 Utah State Legislature
 2008 Election Results
 Office of the Governor

Legislature
57
2000s in Utah
2010 in Utah
2009 in Utah
2009 U.S. legislative sessions
2010 U.S. legislative sessions